Luiz Fernando Corrêa Sales or simply Luiz Fernando  (born July 17, 1988 in Carmo da Mata), is a Brazilian attacking midfielder. He currently plays for Bahraini Premier League side East Riffa Club.

Contract
Cruzeiro: 1 February 2008 to 30 January 2010
Vila Nova: 13 May 2011 to 30 November 2011

External links
 cruzeiro.com

1988 births
Living people
Brazilian footballers
Brazilian expatriate footballers
Cruzeiro Esporte Clube players
Ipatinga Futebol Clube players
Associação Desportiva São Caetano players
Vila Nova Futebol Clube players
Figueirense FC players
Guarani Esporte Clube (MG) players
Rio Claro Futebol Clube players
Dibba FC players
Al-Arabi SC (Kuwait) players
Associação Desportiva Recreativa e Cultural Icasa players
Tombense Futebol Clube players
Mogi Mirim Esporte Clube players
Clube de Regatas Brasil players
Rio Preto Esporte Clube players
América Futebol Clube (RN) players
Villa Nova Atlético Clube players
East Riffa Club players
UAE Pro League players
Campeonato Brasileiro Série A players
Campeonato Brasileiro Série B players
Campeonato Brasileiro Série C players
Campeonato Brasileiro Série D players
Bahraini Premier League players
Association football midfielders
Expatriate footballers in the United Arab Emirates
Brazilian expatriate sportspeople in the United Arab Emirates
Expatriate footballers in Bahrain
Brazilian expatriate sportspeople in Bahrain
Kuwait Premier League players
Brazilian expatriate sportspeople in Kuwait
Expatriate footballers in Kuwait